Three Mile Rock is located near Parson's Pond, Newfoundland and Labrador.
The population in 1991 was 135, in 1996 decreased to only 117.

It is referenced in the Stan Rogers song "The Mary Ellen Carter" as the wrecking place of the titular vessel.

See also
List of communities in Newfoundland and Labrador

Populated coastal places in Canada
Populated places in Newfoundland and Labrador